Srinivasa Kalyana (Kannada: ಶ್ರೀನಿವಾಸ ಕಲ್ಯಾಣ; English: Srinivas's Marriage) is a 2017 Kannada language romantic comedy-philosophical film written and directed by MG Srinivas who also appears in the lead role, along with Sujay Shastry, Kavitha Gowda, Nikhila Suman, Achyuth Kumar and HG Dattatreya playing supporting roles. The movie was released on 24 February 2017 opened to positive reviews.

Cast
 MG Srinivas as Srinivas aka Lakshmi Kantha Baalu
 Sujay Shastry as Benki Seena
 Kavitha Gowda as Akshara
 Nikhila Suman as Radha
 Achyuth Kumar
 H. G. Dattatreya
 Ram Manjjonaath
 Poornachandra Mysore

Soundtrack

The soundtrack of the film was composed by Midhun Mukundan, Raghavendra Thane and remix for Kanasina was done by DJ Yash.

Critical reception
The film opened to positive reviews from critics. Times of India wrote "Go watch Srinivasa Kalyana for some trademark timepass entertainment, with a good dose of naughty jokes to keep you chuckling." Bangalore Mirror wrote "A jolly ride for the youth, Srinivasa Kalyana is a light-hearted comedy that chronicles the love affairs of an individual who seems to be forever on the losing side. The film has been pieced together from a bunch of incidents and jokes and connected to form a story. But it is seamlessly done and the film has a lively narrative." Indiaglitz wrote "The film looks visually good, dialogues are funny, technically new attempts are seen and in 128 minutes of the film ‘Srinivasa Kalyana’ director cum hero of the film MG Srinivas has churned out his best. Srinivasa Kalyana is a film for all ages because it takes you back to earlier days and gives a good feel at the end."

The movie was released and sustained for two weeks in USA and Australia(Melbourne and Sydney) after a critical and commercial success in India. Another element that contributed to the success of this movie was its music by Midhun and Raghu. Gapu Gapalli noticeably was a huge hit among the youth where the song garnered over a million views on YouTube.

References

External links
Srinivasa Kalyana on Facebook

2010s Kannada-language films
2017 films
2017 romantic comedy films
Indian romantic comedy films